The Tallahatchie River is a river in Mississippi which flows  from Tippah County, through Tallahatchie County, to Leflore County, where it joins the Yalobusha River to form the Yazoo River.
At Money, Mississippi, the river's flow measures approximately 7,861 cubic feet per second.

Tallahatchie is a Choctaw name meaning "rock of waters." The sources of the Tallahatchie River have outcrops of iron sandstone.

As part of the Flood Control Act of 1936, the federal government built an earth-filled flood control dam on the Tallahatchie near the town of Sardis, Mississippi, creating Sardis Lake.

Tributaries

Coldwater River
Old Yocona River
Yocona River Canal
Little Tallahatchie River
Old Little Tallahatchie River
Panola Quitman Floodway
McIvor Drainage Canal
Tippah River
Cassidy Bayou
Black Bayou
Ascalmore Creek
Tillatoba Creek

In popular culture

The river is mentioned in "Tallahatchie River Blues," recorded by Mattie Delaney in 1930. This blues song laments the devastation caused in the local African-American community by a flood on the normally shallow river.

The river has historical significance due to the 1955 murder of Emmett Till, an African-American boy visiting from Chicago, who was brutally murdered by white men in Money, Mississippi, for allegedly whistling at a white woman. In 2017, Till's accuser, Carolyn Bryant Donham, spoke to Timothy B. Tyson, a Duke University professor who has written a book, “The Blood of Emmett Till,”. In it, he wrote that she said of her long-ago allegations that Emmett grabbed her and was menacing and sexually crude toward her, “that part is not true.” He was beaten, shot, and sunk in the river with a cotton gin fan tied around his neck by barbed wire. This event is mentioned in the song, "Freedom Highway" by The Staple Singers, in the lines, "Found dead people in the forests, Tallahatchie River and lakes... whole world is wondering, what's wrong with the United States?" Till’s badly mutilated body was found near the river by two boys that were fishing.

The eponymous wooden bridge over the river was popularized in Bobbie Gentry's 1967 hit song "Ode to Billie Joe," which has the refrain, "Billie Joe McAllister jumped off the Tallahatchie bridge." A film was titled Ode to Billy Joe.  The wooden bridge collapsed in 1972 after being set alight by vandals. It crossed the Tallahatchie River at Money, about ten miles north of Greenwood, Mississippi. The bridge has since been replaced.

See also
List of rivers of Mississippi

References

External links

Rivers of Mississippi
Emmett Till
Bodies of water of Leflore County, Mississippi
Bodies of water of Quitman County, Mississippi
Bodies of water of Tallahatchie County, Mississippi
Mississippi placenames of Native American origin